Yes, It's True is the fourth studio album by American pop band The Polyphonic Spree. It was released on August 6, 2013.

Track listing

References

2013 albums
The Polyphonic Spree albums